David 'Marais' Schmidt (born 23 April 1992) is a South African professional rugby union player, that played first class rugby with the  and  between 2011 and 2014. His regular position is fly-half or full-back.

Career

Youth and Varsity Cup rugby

He first played for them at Under-13 level at the primary schools Craven Week tournament in 2005. In 2008, he played for their Under-16 side at the Grant Khomo Week, which also led to his inclusion in a South African Under-16 Elite Squad. He played for the Under-18s at the 2009 Academy Week and the 2010 Craven Week tournaments, top-scoring for the Lions and being selected for a South African Under-18 High Performance Squad in 2010, which played against France, England and Namibia.

He played for the  side in the 2010 Under-19 Provincial Championship, making two appearances, and played a full season in the 2011 Under-19 Provincial Championship, scoring 97 points in eleven starts. He also made one appearance at Under-21 level in the 2011 Under-21 Provincial Championship.

In 2012, he scored 131 points in twelve starts, the second most in the competition behind the s Fred Zeilinga and in 2013, he made thirteen starts and scored 156 points to once again finish second in the scoring charts, this time behind s Tim Swiel. He also won the award for the Lions Backline Player of the Year in 2013.

Schmidt was included in the South Africa Under-20 squad that played at the 2012 IRB Junior World Championship held in South Africa. He made his appearance in the competition, their final pool match against Italy.

In 2014, Schmidt played Varsity Cup rugby for Johannesburg-based university side . He kicked thirteen conversions and two penalties to finish as UJ's top scorer for the competition with 43 points.

Golden Lions

He made a total of five appearances during the competition, contributing 37 points. A further two appearances off the bench followed in the 2014 Vodacom Cup.

Griquas

After the 2014 Vodacom Cup, Schmidt moved to Kimberley-based side . He played off the bench on four occasions during the 2014 Currie Cup qualification tournament, as Griquas won promotion to the 2014 Currie Cup Premier Division.

Blue Bulls

References

Alumni of Monument High School
South African rugby union players
Living people
1992 births
Rugby union fly-halves
Rugby union fullbacks
Golden Lions players
Griquas (rugby union) players
South Africa Under-20 international rugby union players
Rugby union players from Johannesburg